National Olympic Committee of Sri Lanka (IOC code: SRI) is the National Olympic Committee representing Sri Lanka. It is also the body responsible for Sri Lanka's representation at the Commonwealth Games.

See also
Sri Lanka at the Olympics
Sri Lanka at the Commonwealth Games

References

External links
 Official website

Sri Lanka
Sri Lanka
Oly
 
1937 establishments in Ceylon
Sports organizations established in 1937